In the Midst of Your Drama is the third full-length recording by Swedish band The Grand Opening. Originally released on Hamburg label Tapete Records.

Track listing
"Through Your Shield"
"Habits"
"Be Steady"
"Faults and Errors"
"Exit"
"Breakdown"
"Forsaken"
"The Time Remaining"
"This Way Suits Me Well"
"In the Midst of Your Drama"

Personnel
John Roger Olsson: vocals, guitar, vibraphone
Jens Pettersson: drums, backing vocals, bass, guitar
Otto Johansson: guitar, bass
Anders Ljung: wurlitzer
Linus Giertta: piano
Anna Ödlund: backing vocals
Johannes Mayer: backing vocals
Johan Jonsson: trumpet

References

2010 albums
The Grand Opening albums
Tapete Records albums